Momentum accounting and triple-entry bookkeeping is an alternative accountancy system developed by Japanese academic Yuji Ijiri and is the title of his 1989 monograph.  It is a proposed alternative to double-entry bookkeeping, the method favored by the worldwide financial accounting system.

In regular double-entry bookkeeping, changes in balances, such as earning revenues and collecting cash, are recorded.  These events are recorded with two entries, usually a debit and a credit, assigned on a given date.  In momentum accounting, changes in balances are the recognized events.

Example
An acceleration in revenue earning, such as a $1,000 per period increase of revenues from $10,000 per month to $11,000 per month, is a recordable event that would require three entries to implement.

References

Sources
 Blommaert, A.M.M. "Additional disclosure: triple-entry en momentum accounting: kwaliteitsverbetering van management accountingsystemen door het administreren van winstkrachten en winstsnelheden." Dissertation, Maastricht University, 1994, .
 Blommaert, A.M.M. (1995). "Additional disclosure triple-entry and momentum accounting." The European Accounting Review, Vol. 4, No. 3, pp. 580–581.
 Blommaert, A.M.M. and Blommaert, J.M.J. (1990), "Drie-dimensionaal boekhouden II: Doeleinden en comptabele implementatie." Maandblad Bedrijfsadministratie en Bedrijfsorganisatie, No. 1116, pp. 46–52 (in Dutch).
 Blommaert, A.M.M. and Blommaert, J.M.J. (1990), "Drie-dimensionaal boekhouden I: Doeleinden en comptabele implementatie." Maandblad Bedrijfsadministratie en Bedrijfsorganisatie, No. 1117, pp. 82–90 (in Dutch).
 Sousa Ferreira, A.C. de, M.O. Morais, M.C. Silva and R.R. do Santaos (2009), "Integrated analysis in three dimensions: applying for a Brazilian case.", Revista de Informação Contábil, Vol. 3, No. 2, pp. 99–112.
 Fraser, I.A.M. (1993), "Triple-entry bookkeeping: a critique." Accounting and Business Research, Vol. 23, No. 90, pp. 151–158.
 Ijiri, Y. (1993), "Variance analysis and triple-entry bookkeeping." In: Yuji Ijiri (ed.), Creative and innovative approaches to the science of management. The IC2 Management and Management Science Series. Quorum Books, Westport, pp. 3–25.
 Ijiri, Y. (1988), "Momentum accounting and managerial goals on impulses.’ Management Science, Vol. 34, No. 2, pp. 160–166.
 Ijiri, Y. (1987), "Three postulates of momentum accounting.’ Accounting Horizons, Vol. 1, March, pp. 25–34.
 Ijiri, Y. (1986), "A framework for triple-entry bookkeeping." The Accounting Review, Vol. 61, No. 4, 1986, pp. 745–759.
 Ijiri, Y. (1984), "A reliability comparison of the measurement of wealth, income, and force." The Accounting Review, Vol. 59, No. 1, pp. 52–63.
 Yuji Ijiri, Triple-entry bookkeeping and income momentum, Studies in Accounting Research, Vol. 18., American Accounting Association, Sarasota, 1982.
 Eric Melse, "Momentum Accounting for trends. Relevance, explanatory and predictive power of the framework of triple-entry bookkeeping and momentum accounting of Yuji Ijiri." VDM Verlag Dr. Müller, 2010, .
 Eric Melse, "Accounting for trends. Relevance, explanatory and predictive power of the framework of triple-entry bookkeeping and momentum accounting of Yuji Ijiri." Dissertation, Maastricht University, 2008, .
 Melse, E. (2008), Accounting in three dimensions. A case for momentum revisited. The Journal of Risk Finance, Vol. 9, No. 4, pp. 334–350
 Melse, E. (2005), Het verklarend en voorspellend vermogen van Momentum Accounting." Kwartaalschrift Economie. Tijdschrift voor algemeen- en bedrijfseconomische vraagstukken. Vol. 2, No. 4, 2005, pp. 343–371 (in Dutch).
 Melse, E. (2004), "Accounting in three dimensions. A case for momentum." Balance Sheet, Vol. 12, No. 1, pp. 31–36.
 Melse, E. (2004), "What color is your balance sheet?" Balance Sheet, Vol. 12, No. 4, 2004, pp. 17–32.
 Wagensveld, J. (1995), "The future of double-entry." Paper, regional conference of the Northern Accounting Group, British Accounting Association, Newcastle, UK, 13-4-1995. Published as: Ribes, Erasmus Universiteit, Rotterdam, 1995, .
 Tuğrul Bozbey, "Çift Yanlı Kayıt Yönteminin Diferansiyel Temelleri Üzerine Dayanarak İkiden Çok Yanlı Kayıt Tutma Yönteminin Geliştirilmesi" (in Turkish) Dissertation, Selçuk University, 2006, (Dissertation no: 189419) (https://tez.yok.gov.tr/UlusalTezMerkezi/giris.jsp)

Topics
 Melse, E. (2009-10-28), Triple Entry and Momentum Accounting (TEMA) – Video in Dutch. Masterclass.
 Melse, E. (2009-10-28), TEMA analysis of Lehman Brothers – Video in Dutch. Masterclass.

External links
 Warren Henke Triple Entry Accounting

Accounting systems
History of accounting